Shankar Pratap Singh Bundela belongs to village Basari block Rajnagar, which was his former Estate under Madhya Pradesh. He is popularly known as Munna Raja.

Political career 
He joined the Indian National Congress Party in the year 1972 and has been a member ever since.
Elected from Chhatarpur, Madhya Pradesh, he has been a Member of Madhya Pradesh Legislative Assembly twice. From the year 1980 to 1985 and 1993 to 1998.
He went on to become the president of M.P. State Cooperative Agriculture and Rural Development Bank in 1997 and again in the year 2002.
In 2003, he became the Vice-President of National Co-operative Bank Federation, New Delhi.
Contested Madhya Pradesh Legislative Assembly Election 2008 from Rajnagar Constituency of Madhya Pradesh with Bahujan Samaj Party.

Social life 
Since 1997, he has been continuously organising 'Bundeli Festival' (known as Bundeli Utsav) at village Basari to preserve and promote Bundelkhand's Culture and Tradition.

Sources
https://archive.today/20070703053043/http://archive.eci.gov.in/se98/background/S12/winners93-mp.htm item no.49
http://www.rediff.com/election/2003/nov/01mp1.htm
http://news.oneindia.in/2007/03/13/mp-hc-quashes-petition-seeking-cancellation-of-cooperative-elections-1174133273.html
https://web.archive.org/web/20090218153220/http://archive.eci.gov.in/nov2003/pollupd/ac/candlwc/S12/S12INCAcnst.htm
http://archive.eci.gov.in/Nov2003/pollupd/ac/states/s12/Partycomp49.htm
https://web.archive.org/web/20081109072215/http://www.aicc.org.in/home-layout.php?id=62

1950 births
Living people
People from Chhatarpur
Madhya Pradesh MLAs 1980–1985
Madhya Pradesh MLAs 1993–1998
Bharatiya Janata Party politicians from Madhya Pradesh
Indian National Congress politicians from Madhya Pradesh
Bahujan Samaj Party politicians from Madhya Pradesh